Sue Hays Whitesides is a Canadian mathematician and computer scientist, a professor emeritus of computer science and the chair of the computer science department at the University of Victoria in British Columbia, Canada. Her research specializations include computational geometry and graph drawing.

Education and career 
Whitesides received her Ph.D. in mathematics in 1975 from the University of Wisconsin–Madison, under the supervision of Richard Bruck. Before joining the University of Victoria faculty, she taught at Dartmouth College and McGill University; at McGill, she was director of the School of Computer Science from 2005 to 2008.

Service 
Whitesides was the program chair for the 1998 International Symposium on Graph Drawing and program co-chair for the 2012 Symposium on Computational Geometry.

References

External links

Year of birth missing (living people)
Living people
Canadian computer scientists
Canadian women computer scientists
University of Wisconsin–Madison School of Library and Information Studies alumni
Dartmouth College faculty
Academic staff of McGill University
Academic staff of the University of Victoria
Graph drawing people
Researchers in geometric algorithms
Canadian women mathematicians
20th-century Canadian mathematicians
21st-century Canadian mathematicians
20th-century women mathematicians
21st-century women mathematicians
20th-century Canadian women scientists